Mikael Holmertz (born 1965) is a former Swedish swimmer that specialised in butterfly and brother to Swedish Olympic silver medal winner Anders Holmertz. He won two national short course titles in 100 m butterfly representing Motala SS. After his active career he became head coach in Linköpings ASS and coaches Lars Frölander and Marcus Piehl.

Clubs
 Motala SS
Spårvägens SF

References

External links
Snart JSM...  Intervju med Sveriges bästa simklubb
Mikael Holmertz är nöjd med sim-SM 

1965 births
Living people
Swedish male butterfly swimmers
Swedish swimming coaches